Gennady Nikolayevich Rozhdestvensky, CBE (4 May 1931 – 16 June 2018) was a Soviet and Russian conductor.

Biography
Gennady Rozhdestvensky was born in Moscow. His parents were the noted conductor and pedagogue Nikolai Anosov and soprano Natalya Rozhdestvenskaya. His given name was Gennady Nikolayevich Anosov, but he adopted his mother's maiden name in its masculine form for his professional career so as to avoid the appearance of nepotism. His younger brother, the painter P.N. Anosov, retained their father's name.

He studied conducting with his father at the Moscow Conservatory and piano with Lev Oborin. Already known for having conducted Tchaikovsky's The Nutcracker ballet at the Bolshoi Theatre at the age of 20, he quickly established his reputation. He premiered many works by Soviet composers, including Edison Denisov's Le soleil des Incas ("The Sun of the Incas"; 1964), as well as giving the Russian premiere of Benjamin Britten's A Midsummer Night's Dream and the Western premiere of Dmitri Shostakovich's Fourth Symphony at the 1962 Edinburgh Festival.

He became general artistic director of the Bolshoi Theatre in 2000, and in 2001 conducted the world premiere of the original version of Sergei Prokofiev's opera The Gambler. Not long afterwards he resigned, citing desertion by singers, production problems and hostile coverage by the Moscow press.

Among the works dedicated to Rozhdestvensky are Sofia Gubaidulina's symphony Stimmen... Verstummen... and several of Alfred Schnittke's works, such as Symphony No. 1, Symphony No. 8, and Symphony No. 9. Schnittke wrote of him:

I once calculated that there are now some forty compositions written for Rozhdestvensky—either derived from his ideas or else he was the first to conduct them. I could not believe it, but it really is so. I could even say that nearly all my own work as a composer depended on contact with him and on the many talks we had. It was in these talks that I conceived the idea for many of my compositions. I count that as one of the luckiest circumstances of my life.

Conducting
Rozhdestvensky was considered a versatile conductor and a highly cultured musician with a supple stick technique. In moulding his interpretations, he gave a clear idea of the structural outlines and emotional content of a piece, combined with a performing style which melded logic, intuition and spontaneity. In the Soviet Union, he recorded extensively with the big three major contemporary soloists David Oistrakh (violin), Sviatoslav Richter (piano) and Mstislav Rostropovich (cello).

Rozhdestvensky is featured in the documentary Notes interdites: scènes de la vie musicale en Russie Soviétique (English title: "The Red Baton"), which examines the hardships faced by musicians in the Soviet Union under Stalinism. In it, he describes the political situation and its impact on his life, as well as those of Shostakovich, Prokofiev, Stravinsky, Richter and other colleagues. The role of Tikhon Khrennikov, Secretary of the Union of Soviet Composers, is discussed extensively.  As well, the documentary features Rozhdestvensky discussing the art of conducting, and includes footage of masterclasses, rehearsals with students from the Moscow Conservatory and Zürich's Tonhalle orchestra, as well as snippets of Rozhdestvensky conducting Shostakovich's 7th Symphony, Tchaikovsky's Romeo and Juliet, and Alfred Schnittke's Dead Souls.

Shostakovich interpreter
In 2016, Rozhdestvensky was awarded the 7th International Shostakovich Prize for his contribution to the interpretation of the work of Dmitri Shostakovich. At Edinburgh in 1964, he conducted the first performance outside the Soviet Union of the 4th symphony. His 1983 recording of the 8th symphony is considered a classic.
He edited the second volume of the collected works of Shostakovich published in 1984, including the Symphony No. 3 and Symphony No. 4.

Personal life
Rozhdestvensky was married twice.  His first marriage was to the ballerina Nina Timofeeva.  In 1969, Rozhdestvensky married the pianist Viktoria Postnikova. Together they recorded Tchaikovsky's piano concertos. Their son, Sasha Rozhdestvensky, is a violinist, with whom Rozhdestvensky senior recorded the Glazunov and Shostakovich violin concertos in 2007.

Rozhdestvensky was named a People's Artist of the USSR in 1976, and a Hero of Socialist Labour in 1990.  He died on 16 June 2018.

Orchestra tenures
1951–1961: Orchestra of the Bolshoi Theatre (conductor)
1961–1974: Symphony Orchestra of All-Union Radio and Television (Moscow)
1964–1970: Orchestra of the Bolshoi Theatre (principal conductor)
1974–1985: Chamber Theatre Orchestra
1974–1977: Stockholm Philharmonic Orchestra (artistic director)
1978–1981: BBC Symphony Orchestra (chief conductor)
1980–1982: Vienna Symphony
1983–1991: USSR Ministry of Culture Symphony Orchestra
1992–1995: Royal Stockholm Philharmonic
2011–2018:  Iceland Symphony Orchestra (guest conductor)
2011–2018:  Saint Petersburg Philharmonic Orchestra (chief guest conductor)

With the USSR Ministry of Culture Symphony Orchestra he recorded all the symphonies of Dmitri Shostakovich, Alexander Glazunov, Anton Bruckner, Alfred Schnittke, and Arthur Honegger. He also performed all the symphonies of Ralph Vaughan Williams in Leningrad in the late 1980s. Those have been released, by the Melodiya label, in a complete CD box set in April 2014.

He conducted many of the world's greatest orchestras, including the Berlin Philharmonic, the Royal Concertgebouw Orchestra, the Boston Symphony Orchestra, the Chicago Symphony Orchestra, the Cleveland Orchestra, the Israel Philharmonic Orchestra, and the London Symphony Orchestra.

Honours and awards
Hero of Socialist Labour (18 October 1990) —  for outstanding contributions to the development of Soviet music, and effective pedagogical activity
Order of Merit for the Fatherland;
1st class (13 February 2017) – for outstanding contribution to the development of national culture, long-term fruitful activity
2nd class (22 April 2011) —  for outstanding contribution to the development of national musical art, multi-year pedagogical and creative activity
3rd class (31 January 2007) —  for outstanding contribution to the development of national musical culture, and many years of creative and educational activities
4th class (26 April 2001) —  for great contribution to the development of national musical art
Order of the Red Banner of Labour, twice (1967, 1981)
Order of Lenin (1990)
Order of Cyril and Methodius (Bulgaria, 1972)
Officer of the Legion of Honour (France, 2003)
Order of the Rising Sun, 3rd class (Japan, 2002)
Honored Artist of the RSFSR (1959)
People's Artist of the RSFSR (1966)
People's Artist of the USSR (1976)
Lenin Prize (1970)
Russian Federation State Prize in Literature and Art in 1995 (27 May 1996)
Honorary Member of the Royal Swedish Academy (1975)
Honorary Academician of the British Royal Academy of Music (1984)
Grand Prix of Le Chant du Monde 
Diploma of the Académie Charles Cros in Paris (1969) — for the performance of all of Prokofiev's symphonies
Honorary Commander of the Order of the British Empire (2014)

Notes

References

Yampol'sky, I.M., ed. Stanley Sadie, "Rozhdesvensky, Gennady (Nikolayevich)", The New Grove Dictionary of Music and Musicians, First Edition (London: Macmillan, 1980), 20 vols; .

External links

František Sláma (musician) Archive. More on the history of the Czech Philharmonic between the 1940s and the 1980s: Conductors

1931 births
2018 deaths
Musicians from Moscow
20th-century Russian conductors (music)
Russian male conductors (music)
20th-century Russian male musicians
Soviet conductors (music)
Academic staff of Moscow Conservatory
Moscow Conservatory alumni
State Prize of the Russian Federation laureates
Honored Artists of the RSFSR
People's Artists of the RSFSR
People's Artists of the USSR
Heroes of Socialist Labour
Lenin Prize winners
Recipients of the Order of Lenin
Full Cavaliers of the Order "For Merit to the Fatherland"
Recipients of the Order of the Rising Sun, 3rd class
Members of the Royal Swedish Academy of Sciences
Honorary Members of the Royal Academy of Music
Honorary Commanders of the Order of the British Empire
Officiers of the Légion d'honneur
People of the Royal Stockholm Philharmonic Orchestra
Erato Records artists